Chiang Rai is the northernmost major city in Thailand, with a population of about 200,000 people. It is located in Mueang Chiang Rai District, Chiang Rai Province. Chiang Rai was established as a capital city in the reign of King Mangrai, in 1262 CE.

History

The city was founded by King Mangrai in 1262 and became the capital of the Mangrai Dynasty. The word 'Chiang' means 'city' in Thai, so Chiang Rai would mean 'the City of (Mang) Rai'. Subsequently, Chiang Rai was conquered by Burma and remained under Burmese rule for several hundred years. It was not until 1786 that Chiang Rai became a Chiang Mai vassal. Siam (Thailand) annexed Chiang Mai in 1899, and Chiang Rai was proclaimed a province of Thailand in 1933.

In 1432, during the reign of King Sam Fang Kaen of the Mangrai Dynasty (1402–1441), the Phra Kaeo, or Emerald Buddha, the most revered Buddha statue, was discovered in Chiang Rai when an earthquake split the chedi at Wat Phra Kaeo of Chiang Rai city. The beautiful jade figure was then seen concealed within. Another telling of the story has the "Emerald Buddha" hastily covered in mud just before marauders entered to pillage. Many years later, the clunky-looking mud Buddha was found to actually house a magnificent jade statue, perhaps by way of the earthquake mentioned above—which caused a piece of the clay to break off—revealing the jade beneath.

In 1992, the city pillar was moved from Wat Klang Wiang to Wat Phra That Doi Chom Thong, where it is known as Sadue Mueang, the "navel" or omphalos of the city.

Geography
Chiang Rai lies on the flat alluvial plain of the Kok River, a tributary of the Mekong, between the Daen Lao Range in the north and the Phi Pan Nam Range in the south. The Lao River, a tributary of the Kok, flows south of Chiang Rai.

There are four bridges spanning the Kok River within the town's boundaries, each running south–north. Most of the terrain surrounding Chiang Rai town is either flat or has moderate hills. The exception is outward in the west and north-west directions, where limestone hills are evident, some of which have vertical exposed cliffs. That is also the direction where most of the region's hill tribe people have their villages, further afield.

Climate
Chiang Rai has a tropical wet and dry climate (Köppen climate classification Aw). Winters are fairly dry and warm. The monsoon season runs from late April through October, with heavy rain and somewhat cooler temperatures during the day, although nights remain warm.

Demographics
According to the Thai National Statistical Office, as of September 2010, Chiang Rai municipal district had a population of 199,699. With the spread of the city extending into neighboring districts, the metropolitan area is considered somewhat larger by local residents. Chiang Rai city is the capital city and business center of the Chiang Rai Province, home to 1.1 million residents.

A significant share—12.5 percent—of the population are of hill tribes descent. "Hill tribes" is a collective term for the minority ethnic groups in north Thailand such as the Karen, Akha, Lisu, Miao, and Hmong.

Government

Chiang Rai City is the capital of Chiang Rai Province.

The city hall  houses the provincial offices. The thesaban houses the municipal offices .

Buddhist temples

 Wat Phra That Doi Chom Thong, 
 Wat Phra Kaeo, Chiang Rai, 
 Wat Phra Sing, Chiang Rai, 
 Wat Doi Khao Khwai, 
 Wat Rong Khun, a modern temple built since 1998 by Thai artist Chalermchai Kositpipat
 Chedi Doi Trimoorati,

Education

Colleges and universities
 Mae Fah Luang University
 Chiang Rai Rajabhat University
 Rajamangala University of Technology Lanna, Chiang Rai Campus

International schools
 Chiang Rai International School
 Chiang Rai International Christian School

High schools
 Samakkhi Witthayakhom School 
 Damrongratsongkroh School
Chiang Rai Witthayakhom School
 Chiangrai municiplarity school 6
 Chiang Rai International School

Primary schools
 PSEP Bilingual School. 
 Bansankhong (Chiangraijaroonrat) School 
 Piti Suksa Montessori School 
 AMEC School, Chiang Rai

Hospitals
In 2018 the survivors of the Tham Luang cave rescue were brought to Chiang Rai, the nearest large city for hospital care.
 
 Overbrook Hospital (semi-private) Founded in 1903 by Dr. William A. Briggs, as a Missionary hospital.
 Kasemrad Sriburin General Hospital, Private hospital.
 Chiang Rai Prachanukhro Hospital, Public hospital.
 Fort Mengraimaharaj Hospital, Military public hospital.
 Chiang Rai Inter Hospital, Private hospital.
 Bangkok Hospital - Chiang Rai, Private hospital by BDMS chain.

Transportation
Route 1 runs from Bangkok through Chiang Rai to Mae Sai on the Burma border. Chiang Rai is 839 kilometers from Bangkok, about 14 hours by car or by bus. According to official bus schedules, the bus ride to Chiang Rai from Chiang Mai takes approximately 3 hours and 30 minutes, All of these times should take into account the rainy season which lasts from about June to late October, this can severely inhibit travel with road sections often completely flooded and even washed out.

Several flights are available to and from Bangkok daily. Mae Fah Luang International Airport flight time is about 1 hour and 30 minutes. There are several major operators including Thai Airways, Air Asia, Nok Air.

There is scheduled boat service between Chiang Rai and Thaton in Chiang Mai Province daily. This journey will last about 3–4 hours and is a pleasant alternative to the bus ride through the mountains.

There are currently no rail services to Chiang Rai as the railway line from Bangkok ends at Chiang Mai. There have been talks of extending the rail line from Den Chai to Chiang Rai in the near future, but this is unlikely to happen as the city's population is well below 1 million and there aren't as many international tourists visiting Chiang Rai as Chiang Mai. Also there are no major industrial complexes in the region as it is largely a rural economy.

References

External links

 
 https://www.youtube.com/watch?v=B191JbbquhQ&t=9s

1262 establishments in Asia
Populated places in Chiang Rai province
Cities and towns in Thailand
13th-century establishments in Thailand